Charles Luhende (born 21 January 1989) is a Tanzanian football defender who plays for Kagera Sugar.

References

1989 births
Living people
Tanzanian footballers
Tanzania international footballers
Kagera Sugar F.C. players
Young Africans S.C. players
Mtibwa Sugar F.C. players
Mwadui United F.C. players
Association football defenders
Tanzanian Premier League players